There have been American Scouts overseas since almost the inception of the movement, often for similar reasons as the present day. Within the Boy Scouts of America (BSA), these expatriate Scouts are now served by two overseas Councils and the Direct Service program. Within the Girl Scouts of the USA, the USAGSO serves such a purpose.

Boy Scouts of America

Direct Service
The Direct Service is a program service of the Boy Scouts of America's International Division, created in 1955 to make the Scouting program available to citizens of the United States and their dependents living in countries outside the jurisdiction of the Transatlantic Council (headquartered in Brussels, Belgium and serving American Scouts in Europe, Africa and the Middle East), the Aloha Council (serving youth residing in much of the eastern and Central Pacific as well as Guam, American Samoa, and several Hawaiian islands) and the Far East Council (headquartered in Japan, serving several nations in the western Pacific.)

The National Capital Area Council administers Direct Service serving chartered in North and South America.

History

According to BSA records and Reports to Congress, BSA overseas councils were referred to as "Extra Regional"—being outside the BSA's then-twelve Scouting regions in the states, which were consolidated in 1973 to six and again to the current four in 1993. Overseas councils were organized in the Panama Canal Zone (1923), Peking, China (1923), Philippines (1924), and Guam (1947). The "Direct Service Council" was formed in 1956, as a result of conversations within the BSA's national office in New Jersey.  Several Scouting associations, on behalf of their American citizens living in those countries, wanted to have American Scouts and Scouters to serve as part of their associations while overseas. In fact, the high commissioners in Japan, Europe, and Panama invited BSA to send commissioned Scout executives to help create a program for Americans living overseas. International Scouting accords discouraged such memberships except via wartime criteria that allowed for a small number of youth to take part in local programs when no program of their own host nation existed. The BSA's response was to create within the International Division a "local Council equal" which would do many if not all the services which the BSA provides to communities in other areas of the world and within the United States. These services include membership accounting, unit chartering and rechartering, advancement reporting and filing, insignia and badge issuance, certification of awards and advice on where to conduct Scouting-related activities (mostly camping or ways that the BSA's requirements to "visit community agencies", for instance, could be met while in Zaire or the Isle of Man or in Peru).  Direct Service Council did not include Transatlantic, Far East, Aloha, or Canal Zone Councils which had BSA charters to operate as councils since the early 1950s.

The Direct Service Council was headed initially by James R. Sands, the Associate National Director of the BSA's International Division and assisted by two staffers and two technicians.  Key national staff officers working within the BSA's National Office wore "extra hats" as Direct Service Council "staffers"; while key volunteers served as members of the Executive Board of the Council and key BSA youth members were initially made leaders of the Council's youth programs until the Council could get on its feet.  After 1974, the Council elected their own Council officers (by mail) and an election was held to elect youth representatives for their Order of the Arrow Lodge and their Explorer Presidents Association chapter. In 1989 the practice was discontinued and appointments were made directly through postal mail from the national office.

In areas whereby significant numbers of American citizens lived, "District" organizations existed. These areas included Hong Kong, Guatemala and Central America, Saudi Arabia and Kuwait, Kenya and the countries surrounding Lake Victoria, Mexico and the Caribbean, and Canada. Each "District" had a volunteer structure, to include District Chairs and members as well as Commissioners to assist existing and new units.  Some "Districts" even raised the funding necessary to "borrow" an executive with a multinational firm to serve as their District's professional representative; in other cases, firms like Saudi Aramco "donated" an executive to head up Scouting in that part of the world. Those individuals coordinated directly with the BSA's International offices and in the 70s and 80s had the resources to quickly get materials, training aids, awards and insignia, and uniforms to youth and adult members within their areas.

While the BSA officially had no "Districts" within Direct Service Council, they did respond positively to the effort by creating special versions of the traditional Direct Service Council insignia to be worn by youth residing in those parts of the Council's "territory" without calling them "Districts". Before Direct Service Council folded, there were ten official such "Council Shoulder Patches" or CSPs in addition to the default CSP. In many areas of the Council, individual units and parents of Lone Scouts created their own unofficial CSP emblem to wear, with flags and symbology of the local area on those patches, instead of the standard emblem. A 12th such emblem was created when Canal Zone merged with Direct Service later.

In 1973, the Direct Service Council newsletter was created, to further provide information to DSC Scouts and Scouters and those serving on its Council "staff" and "leadership".  Much of the information was copied from other BSA publications with specific information about registration, how to participate in BSA national and international activities/events, and new forms placed as inserts. In 1975, the first instances of the word "District" were printed in the newsletter, further acknowledging the growth of this "notional local Council."

The "expansion" and "contraction" of the Direct Service Council depended heavily on the numbers of Americans living in those countries not served by active BSA Councils overseas.  This explains why in some years individuals or specific countries in Europe, North Africa, and the Near and Far East were alternately parts of Aloha Council (serving many Pacific island nations), or Transatlantic Council (serving much of Europe, Northern Africa and the Near East) or the Far East Council (serving the far end of the Pacific rim) one year, and the next year part of Direct Service Council. Council territories expanded and contracted, which made it important that the small International Division staff stay in constant touch with overseas  Councils and their professional staffs.

With the retirement in 1986 of Jim Sands, the BSA's biggest defender and supporter of International Scouting, Margerite ("Marge") Weilexbaum was appointed as the Council's Administrator, who provided administrative services normally provided by a commissioned professional Scouter.  She attempted to hold things together until her retirement in 1995.

In 1987, the former Panama Canal (Zone) Council was consolidated and made a part of the Direct Service Council, in a similar way that other Councils were consolidated or merged to form larger local Councils in other areas of the world. An "official" 12th CSP issued by the former Council for its youth to wear featured the words "Direct Service" in addition to the words "Canal Zone."  While not officially created by the BSA, the patch was worn by DSC youth and adults living in the Zone until the middle 90s.

In 1990, a national office shakeup and reorganization slimmed down the International Division and many of its functions were sheared off to other program divisions within the National office.  Many DSC Scouters state that this was the start of the end of the Council.

With the retirement of its longtime Administrator five years later, several decisions were made with regard to the Council.

The first was that it would no longer serve or be listed as a "local Council" but rather, in the traditions of the old Lone Scout Service, would serve as a "service element" within the National office.  Scouts and Scouters would continue to receive "direct service" from the staff, but the staffing would be cut almost to the bone — from five to two.  It was understood that with the advent of faster communication and coordination between units and individuals in the field and the national offices, that the existing staffing support was no longer needed. The newsletter was discontinued.

The second was that all supporting elements which made Direct Service a true gem in the eyes of those members and Scouters in the field would be eliminated.  This means that in some locations, the "borrowed executives" used to support "district and multi unit" activities in the Council would no longer be supported. BSA Camp inspections at several camps in the former Council would also cease, as well as most Order of the Arrow activities.  The Lodge would continue, and individual units may continue to hold OA elections.  The actual Ordeal, Brotherhood, and Vigil Honor ceremonies, however, would be conducted by local Councils in Europe, the Far East or Pacific or held until the Scout or Scouter could return Stateside to participate.  This was further restricted by the Order of the Arrow in 1999.

The biggest impact was that the Council could no longer conduct sustaining membership enrollment, or "Friends of Scouting" campaigns as a Council any longer.  Units, individuals and those organizations and corporations supporting American Scouting around the world would instead be asked to donate directly to the National Office with funding no longer "earmarked" for the Direct Service Council, but placed in the general operation funds of the BSA.

In 1998, the word "Council" was finally removed from the Direct Service and plans to no longer issue or sell the ten existing Council CSPs would be made.  The Direct Service Council finally died although the BSA continues to this day to provide "direct service" to youth and adults living and working around the world—in those locations where there no longer exists a BSA local Council.

Administration
Direct Service is administered by the International Division of the Boy Scouts of America. It provides some of the same services that a local council provides: Processing registration and magazine subscriptions, maintaining records, approving advancements, processing supply orders, organizing National and World Jamboree participation, operating Gamenowinink Lodge #555, Order of the Arrow, and providing information and program resources.

Membership
Approximately 3,000 youth members and 1,000 adult leaders belong to Direct Service units, or are registered as Lone Scouts in isolated areas of the world. Direct Service members are the children of international businesspeople, American expat community, diplomatic corps officials, and U.S. military personnel. Direct Service serves 100 Cub Scout packs, Scouts BSA troops, and Venturing crews in 47 countries on five continents.

Currently, the following countries have one or more Scouting units registered through Direct Service:

Argentina
Bahrain
Belarus
Bolivia
Bulgaria
Canada
Chile
Costa Rica
Cuba
Dominican Republic
Egypt
El Salvador
Ethiopia

Ghana
Guatemala
Honduras
Iceland
Israel
Jordan
Kazakhstan
Kenya
Kuwait
Mauritania
Mexico
Myanmar
Nepal

Nigeria
Panama
Peru
Qatar
Russia
Saudi Arabia
Trinidad and Tobago
Ukraine
United Arab Emirates
Uruguay
Venezuela

Program
The meetings and activities of Direct Service units are basically the same as those in the United States. Minor modifications are sometimes necessary because of circumstances that occur when living in another country. These modifications often lead to cooperative efforts between the BSA members and Scouts of other associations who attend joint Scouting activities such as jamborees, rallies, community projects, and other events. Local groups of units (formerly districts under the former Direct Service Council) maintain their own camps.

Chartered organizations
The chartered organizations of Direct Service units include American schools and churches, international schools, U.S. embassies, multinational corporations, parents' groups, veteran organizations and groups, and fraternal organizations.

Order of the Arrow
Gamenowinink Lodge, chartered in 1962, serves 135 Arrowmen as of 2004. The lodge totem is a globe, and the name translates to "On the Other Side of the Great Sea" in the Lenni Lenape language. Gamenowinink Lodge is under the supervision and administration of the BSA International Division in Irving, Texas. In 1971 Gamenowinink Lodge absorbed Cuauhtli Lodge #446, which was sponsored by the American Society of Mexico, which served American Scouts in Mexico, and in 1987 absorbed Chiriqui Lodge #391 of the Panama Canal Council, which served American Scouts in the former Panama Canal Zone.

Overseas Arrowman
Several alumni groups exist to support American Scout Councils and the Order of the Arrow overseas. Foremost among them is the Overseas Arrowman Association (OAA), a private organization incorporated in 1989,  and the TAC (Transatlantic Council) Alumni Association.

Awards
Scouting awards are presented as in any local council, including the Silver Beaver Award and the District Award of Merit. All nominations are reviewed by the BSA Direct Service committee.

Financial support
Direct Service units organize their own activities to earn money for special programs, equipment, and service projects.

Communications
Communication between the International Division and its Direct Service units is by mail, fax, e-mail, and telephone. Unit leaders receive periodic bulletins containing special information.

Canada
One of the newest BSA direct service units, Troop 511, was established in 2008 and is chartered to the Western Chapter of the American Chamber of Commerce in Canada in Calgary, Alberta.

Far East Council

The Far East Council, headquartered in Okinawa, Japan, was created in 1953 to make the Scouting program available to United States citizens and their dependents living in several nations in the western Pacific.

Administration
Far East Council is organized similar to other BSA local Councils, and follows the Status of Forces Agreements with their host nations and the U.S. military. Far East Council is a part of the Western Region, BSA

Organization
Far East Council members are the children of international businessmen and women, American expat community, diplomatic corps officials, and U.S. military personnel. Far East Council has four districts that serve Cub Scout packs, Scouts BSA troops, and Venturing crews in five countries.

Each district has the following countries and units registered through Far East Council:

Asia East District
Japan
Atsugi
Camp Zama
Kobe
Misawa
Tokyo
Yokota
Yokosuka
Nagoya

Asia Central District
Okinawa
Camp Courtney
Camp Foster
Camp Kinser
Futenma
Gushikawa
Kadena
Southern Japan
Iwakuni
Sasebo

Asia-West District
South Korea
Camp Humphreys
Daegu
Osan
Pyeongtaek
Taiwan
Taipei
Hsinchu
China, People's Republic (17 units)
Hong Kong (5 units)
Nepal
Mongolia

Asia South District
Thailand
Bangkok
Chiangmai
Philippines
Manila
Makati City
Tanay, Rizal
Angeles City, Pampanga
Australia
Bangladesh
Brunei
Cambodia
India
Indonesia
Laos
Malaysia
New Zealand
Singapore
Vietnam

Program

The meetings and activities of Far East Council units are basically the same as those in the United States. Minor modifications are sometimes necessary because of circumstances that occur when living in another country. These modifications often lead to cooperative efforts between the BSA members and Scouts of other associations who attend joint Scouting activities such as jamborees, rallies, community projects, and other events.

Camps
 Camp Tama, Japan
 Camp Tiger, South Korea
 Camp Dragon, Okinawa, Japan
 Asia Adventure Camp (which moves around between Nepal, Thailand, and Mongolia)

Chartered Organizations
The chartered organizations of Far East Council units include schools and churches, international schools, U.S. embassies, multinational corporations, parents' groups, veteran organizations and fraternal organizations.

Order of the Arrow
The Achpateuny Lodge, originally chartered in 1953 as Hinode Goya Lodge 498 (Rising Sun), serves 441 Arrowmen as of 2021. The lodge totem is a dragon, and the name Achpateuny translates to "East Wind" in the Lenni Lenape language. Officially, Baluga Lodge 538 (founded May 1959 at Clark Air Base in the Philippines, and functioned under the BSA International Division), merged with Hinode Goya. The lodge later changed its name to Ikunuhkatsi (reportedly translated from Filipino Aeta language as "a Gathering of the Nations") in 1975. Ikunuhkatsi was inactive near the end of its charter year in 1983, and in 1985 it was rechartered as Achpateuny Lodge.

Awards
Trail medals are issued for the hiking and cleanup of several World War II and historic sites, such as Task Force Smith throughout the Council territory.  Taiwan has the Silver Moccasin medal for those who backpack across the island West to East (usually) on the historic Neng Gau trail (in the 1960s and 1970s) or the historic Batongguan Trail (a 9-day trek taken by several Scouts in 2008).  In 2005 Taiwan District re-cast the historic Golden Carabao medal, which was awarded in the 1960s and 1970s to adult volunteers for exemplary service.

Transatlantic Council

The Transatlantic Council, originally created in May 1950 as EUCOM, BSA Advisory Board and later EUCOM Advisory Council, serves to make the BSA program available to United States citizens and their dependents living in west-and-central Europe, the Near East, and North Africa. The boundaries of the Council constantly shift due to changing political alliances and circumstances in nations where servicemen are stationed. Transatlantic Council has served nations as diverse as Norway and Ethiopia. In landmass, it is the largest of the councils of the Boy Scouts of America.

History
There have been American Scouts overseas since almost the inception of the movement, often for similar reasons as the present day.  Troops existed, sometimes chartered under the British system, sometimes not chartered until the creation of the Council. Lone Scouts were under the direct service of the Boy Scouts of America.

Administration
Transatlantic Council falls within the Northeast Region, BSA.

Organization
Transatlantic Council members are the children of international businesspeople, American expat community, diplomatic corps officials, and U.S. military personnel. Transatlantic serves Cub Scout packs, Scouts BSA troops, and Venturing crews in 50 countries on three continents.

Currently, the following countries have one or more Scouting units registered through Transatlantic Council:

 Mayflower District
 England: London, RAF Lakenheath, RAF Mildenhall, RAF Feltwell, RAF Alconbury/Molesworth, RAF Croughton,  Menwith Hill Station
 Scotland: Aberdeen
 Ireland
 Norway: Stavanger, Oslo
 Charlemagne District
 Netherlands: The Hague, Schinnen (AFNORTH), Amsterdam
 Denmark: Copenhagen
Sweden. Stockholm
 Belgium: Brussels, Waterloo, SHAPE (Mons)
 Luxembourg
 Germany: Geilenkirchen, Düsseldorf, Hamburg
 France: Paris
 Switzerland: Geneva

 Barbarossa District
 Germany: Kaiserslautern, Ramstein, Landstuhl, Sembach, Baumholder Frankfurt Bonn
 Edelweiss District
 Germany: Stuttgart, Heidelberg, Wiesbaden, Frankfurt, Dexheim, Darmstadt, Oberursel, Bamberg, Munich, Garmisch, Oberammergau, Hanau, Schweinfurt, Kitzingen, Ansbach, Grafenwoehr, Vilseck, Illesheim, Hohenfels, Berlin, Hamburg, Dresden
 Switzerland: Bern, Zurich, Basel
 Austria: Vienna
Czech Republic: Prague
 Hungary: Budapest, Pápa
Lithuania: Vilnius
 Poland: Warsaw
 Slovakia: Bratislava

 Mediterranean District
Albania: Tirana
 Croatia: Zagreb
 Cyprus: Nicosia
 Greece: Athens
 Italy: Aviano, Vicenza, Milan, Camp Darby (Livorno, Pisa) Rome, Naples, Sigonella (Sicily)
 Spain: Madrid, Rota
 Portugal: Lisbon, Lajes (Azores Islands)
 Turkey: Istanbul, Incirlik, Ankara

Horizon District
 Angola: Luanda*
 Azerbaijan:Baku*
 Bahrain: Manama*
 Egypt: Cairo*
 Ethiopia: Addis Ababa*
 Jordan: Amman*
 Israel: Jerusalem, Tzfat*
 Kazakhstan: Atyrau*
 Kenya: Nairobi*
 Kuwait: Kuwait City*
 Nigeria: Lagos*
 Qatar: Doha*
 Romania: Bucharest*
 Russia: Moscow*
 Saudi Arabia: Dhahran, Jeddah, Jubail, Ras Tanura, Thuwal*
 Uganda: Fort Portal*
 United Arab Emirates: Abu Dhabi, Dubai*
 Zimbabwe: Harare*

Program
The meetings and activities of Transatlantic Council units are basically the same as those in the United States. Minor modifications are sometimes necessary because of circumstances that occur when living in another country. These modifications often lead to cooperative efforts between the BSA members and Scouts of other associations who attend joint Scouting activities such as jamborees, rallies, community projects, and other events.

Camps

Camp Alpine - Kandersteg, Switzerland

Camp Avantura - Vli Jože, Croatia

Chartered Organizations
The chartered organizations of Transatlantic Council units include American military bases, schools and churches, international schools, U.S. embassies, multinational corporations, parents' groups, veterans' groups, and fraternal organizations.

Order of the Arrow
The Black Eagle Lodge, chartered in 1952 as Bald Eagle Lodge, serves 615 Arrowmen as of 2004. Another Bald Eagle Lodge had been previously chartered and the lodge changed the name to Black Eagle Lodge.  The lodge totem is a black eagle, a stylized version of the traditional heraldic black eagle emblem of Germany. Its history of neckerchiefs and patches is at Matt Kirkland's Black Eagle Lodge 482 Patch Museum. A history of documents, newsletters and programs can be found at Black Eagle Lodge 482.

Awards

Trail medals are issued for the hiking and cleanup of several World War I and World War II sites throughout the Council territory.

Girl Scouts of the USA 

Girl Scouts of the USA are serviced by way of USA Girl Scouts Overseas (USAGSO) headquartered in New York. USAGO has four offices:

 USA Girl Scouts Overseas—North Atlantic serves units in Europe
 USA Girl Scouts Overseas—West Pacific serves units in Japan, Okinawa and Korea
 USA Girl Scouts Overseas—U.S. Virgin Islands serves the Virgin Islands
 Guam Girl Scouts Council serves the island of Guam

See also

References

External links

Overseas branches of Scouting and Guiding associations
Scouting in the United States
American expatriate organizations